Ulupaʻu Crater (also known as Ulupaʻu Head) is a tuff cone in the U.S. state of Hawaii, located near Marine Corps Base Hawaii on the Mokapu Peninsula.

It formed as a result of the Honolulu Volcanic Series, which was a set of eruptions from the Koʻolau Range during its rejuvenation stage. The HVS also created other volcanoes such as Diamond Head. The eastern part of Ulupaʻu's rim was destroyed due to erosion. A cinder cone known as Puʻu Hawaiʻiloa is located nearby on the same peninsula.

See also 

 Honolulu Volcanics
 Koʻolau Range
 Marine Corps Base Hawaii
 Cinder cone
 Puʻu Hawaiʻiloa
 Kāneʻohe Bay

References 

Cinder cones of the United States
Geography of Honolulu County, Hawaii
Protected areas of Oahu